Orava Parish was a rural municipality in south-eastern Estonia, Põlva County. The municipality had a population of 854 (as of 1 January 2008) and covered an area of 175.52 km². The population density was 4.9 inhabitants per km².

Villages
There were a total of 30 villages in Orava Parish. Administrative centre of the municipality was Orava village. Other villages were Hanikase, Jantra, Kahkva, Kakusuu, Kamnitsa, Kliima, Korgõmõisa, Kõivsaare, Kõliküla, Kõvera, Lepassaare, Liinamäe, Luuska, Madi, Marga, Oro, Piusa, Praakmani, Päka, Pääväkese, Rebasmäe, Riihora, Rõssa, Soe, Soena, Suuremetsa, Tamme, Tuderna and Vivva

Gallery

References

External links